Hugo Marchand (born ) is a French ballet dancer. He joined the Paris Opera Ballet in 2011 and was named étoile in 2017, at age 23.

Early life
Marchand was born in Nantes. He trained at Nantes Conservatory, before leaving home to study at the Paris Opera Ballet School for four years. He stated that he "didn't like the atmosphere or the rigid structure very much".

Career
In 2011, Marchand joined the Paris Opera Ballet. In 2014, he won the third prize at the Varna International Ballet Competition. The same year he was spotted by Benjamin Millepied, who had just become the director of dance, and Marchand began understudying for lead roles, which led to his debuts in The Nutcracker, La Bayadère and Balanchine's Theme and Variations. Marchand was promoted every year under Millepied's tenure, and the pattern continued after Aurélie Dupont took over.

In March 2017, Marchand was promoted to étoile following his unexpected debut as James in Lacotte's La Sylphide when the company was touring in Japan. Months later, he was awarded Prix Benois de la Danse for his performance as Romeo in Nureyev's Romeo and Juliet. His repertory includes classical ballets, as well as works by Millepied, George Balanchine, Jerome Robbins, John Cranko, Rudolf Nureyev and William Forsythe.

In 2021, his memoir Danser was published. Marchand stated he thought he was too young to write one but the editor told him she "wanted to hear the voice of a young person talking about following their passion, and what the costs were of that". He wrote it with the help of Caroline de Bodinat. In the book, he also wrote that under the Paris Opera Ballet's hierarchy, dancers are "bullied, humiliated and subjected to disparaging remarks". Later that year, he worked with colleague Hannah O'Neill on a pas de deux for Gagosian Premieres.

References

Living people
1990s births
People from Nantes
French male ballet dancers
Paris Opera Ballet étoiles
Prix Benois de la Danse winners
21st-century French ballet dancers